Kahriz-e Salim (also Romanized as Kahrīz-e Salīm and Kahrīz Salīm; also known as Kārīz) is a village in Khezel-e Sharqi Rural District, Khezel District, Nahavand County, Hamadan Province, Iran. At the 2006 census, its population was 786, in 194 families.

References 

Populated places in Nahavand County